Moreldin Mohamed Hamdi (born 1943) is a Sudanese hurdler. He competed in the men's 110 metres hurdles at the 1972 Summer Olympics.

References

1943 births
Living people
Athletes (track and field) at the 1972 Summer Olympics
Sudanese male hurdlers
Olympic athletes of Sudan
Place of birth missing (living people)